Amber Nicole Cope (born August 18, 1983) is a professional stock car racing driver. She is known for making NASCAR history with her sister Angela Cope-Ruch. they became the first twins to compete in one of its top three series on October 23, 2010.That day they made their NASCAR debut in the Camping World Truck Series in Martinsville, Virginia. Amber finished 26th and Angela finished 30th.

Cope and her sister began racing in Go-Karts at age nine. They quickly gained attention by winning poles and races year after year. By age 15, they stepped up to late-model race cars—even before they had driver's licenses.

In 1995, Cope finished third in the Tri-cities Gold Cup "Yamaha Class". By 1998, both sisters were PSGKA Gold Cup winners in the "Junior Piston Port".

Cope and her sister split seat time in 2006 at the ARCA Re/Max Series at Berlin, Gateway, Chicagoland, Milwaukee Mile, and Toledo, Ohio. By 2008, the twins qualified for the ARCA Re/Max Series at Kentucky Speedway, with positions 8 and 15.

On July 14, 2012, Cope was involved in an incident with Kevin Harvick during the final stages of a Nationwide Series race at New Hampshire when it appeared as though she forced Harvick down the racetrack, which in turn slowed his momentum and enabled Brad Keselowski to win.

Racing career
Residents of Cornelius, North Carolina, Amber and Angela Cope became the third generation of Copes to enter into the world of racing, when, at nine, the girls' parents gave them a go-kart for Christmas and thus began their road to NASCAR. Once they began competing locally, the girls made a name for themselves and became the most accomplished go-kart racers in the Greater Puget Sound region.  In their seven years of driving go-karts included 50 first place wins and setting on pole position 20 times in the Pacific Northwest. Angela also set new track records at five of six tracks in the same region.

At 15, they progressed to late model race cars even before they had their license to drive.  In 2000, a very short time after their debut in late model stock cars they instantly acquired national attention when they were featured on The TODAY Show with Bryant Gumbel.
As Amber and Angela became more experienced and confident behind the wheel, they knew that in order to pursue a career in NASCAR they would have to leave Washington. They moved across the country to Charlotte, North Carolina to start training with uncle Derrike Cope, traveling to every Cup race that he attended.

In 2006, the twins split seat time at the Automobile Racing Club of America's (ARCA) Re/Max Series at Berlin, Gateway, Chicagoland, Milwaukee and Toledo, Ohio. In 2008, they qualified for the ARCA Re/Max Series at Kentucky Speedway with positions 8 and 15. The most difficult part of the ARCA Re/Max Series was that they had to share a car. At times, there would be three weeks before one of them would get back into the seat, losing precious learning time; however, it was a great series for the twins performance-wise.

On October 23, 2010, Amber and Angela Cope became the first twins to compete in the same NASCAR national touring series event, competing together in the Kroger 200 at Martinsville Speedway in the Camping World Truck Series.

Amber Cope made one start in the Nationwide Series in 2011. In 2012, she shared the No. 24 SR2 Motorsports Toyota in the Nationwide Series with Angela Cope and Benny Gordon on a part-time schedule; in her only Nationwide Series start of the season, in the F.W. Webb 200 at New Hampshire Motor Speedway, she became the center of controversy after holding up leader Kevin Harvick late in the race; Harvick afterwards stated that Cope "is trying to be Danica Patrick...and [should] find a new job".

Motorsports career results

NASCAR
(key) (Bold – Pole position awarded by qualifying time. Italics – Pole position earned by points standings or practice time. * – Most laps led.)

Nationwide Series

Camping World Truck Series

ARCA Re/Max Series
(key) (Bold – Pole position awarded by qualifying time. Italics – Pole position earned by points standings or practice time. * – Most laps led.)

 Season still in progress
 Ineligible for series points

References

External links
 
 

Living people
1983 births
Sportspeople from Puyallup, Washington
Racing drivers from Washington (state)
NASCAR drivers
ARCA Menards Series drivers
American twins
Cope family
American female racing drivers
Twin sportspeople
People from Cornelius, North Carolina